The Mill Creek is a stream in southwest Ohio. The section of Interstate 75 through Cincinnati is known as the Mill Creek Expressway.

The Mill Creek Valley is a remnant of the Deep Stage Ohio River from the days of the Last Glacial Maximum. The stream, with its water power and valley, were important to the development of Cincinnati. Then, for a time, the steep hillsides that surround the creek limited expansion and gave impetus to the free growth of surrounding communities that were over that barrier. Finally, inclined planes solved the problem, before highways and automobiles eliminated it.

Pollution
Throughout Cincinnati's history, Mill Creek has been the scene of heavy industry.  At the turn of the 20th-century, it was seen as "a great open city sewer". In 1997, it was described as "the most endangered urban river in America."

Discharge 
A USGS stream gauge on the creek at Mitchell Avenue in Cincinnati recorded a mean annual discharge of  during the four combined water years 1942-1943 and 1946-1947.

Crossings
A number of substantial viaducts cross the valley of the Mill Creek. From south to north, the crossings - both high above and near the water level - are:
CSX Transportation rail spur
Sixth Street Expressway/Waldvogel Viaduct (U.S. Route 50/State Route 264)
Sixth Street and the Indiana and Ohio Railway "Ditch Track"
CSX "Oklahoma Track" on the Indiana Subdivision
CSX "Cincinnati Industrial Track" (former Toledo Subdivision main track)
Eighth Street Viaduct
Gest Street
Western Hills Viaduct
Hopple Street Viaduct
Millcreek Road
Spring Grove Avenue
Interstate 74/U.S. Route 27/U.S. Route 52
Ludlow Viaduct (Hamilton Avenue) (US 127)
CSX railroad
Clifton Avenue
Mitchell Avenue
CSX Railroad
Spring Grove Avenue
Cognis Corporation pipe bridge
CSX rail spur
CSX railroad
Cognis Corporation pipe bridge
Cognis Corporation (private roadway)
Cognis Corporation (private roadway)
Cognis Corporation pipe bridge
Cognis Corporation (private roadway)
CSX rail spur
Center Hill Avenue
West Seymour Avenue
West North Bend Road
CSX Railroad
Vine Street (SR 4)
Anthony Wayne Avenue
CSX Railroad
Private roadway
Interstate 75
SR 126 eastbound (Ronald Reagan Highway)
SR 126 westbound (Ronald Reagan Highway)
East Galbraith Road
Clark Road
Koehler Avenue (Davis Street)
Interstate 75
West Benson Street (East Wyoming Avenue)
Interstate 75
West Columbia Avenue
General Electric Aviation (private roadway)
Norfolk Southern Railroad
Formica Corporation (private roadway)
Cunningham Drive
Glendale-Milford Road
Norfolk Southern Railroad
Norfolk Southern Railroad
Norfolk Southern Railroad
Norfolk Southern Railroad
Medallion Drive
CSX Railroad
East Sharon Road
CSX Railroad
East Kemper Road
Interstate 275
CSX Railroad
East Crescentville Road
Allen Road
Village Centre Avenue
Union Centre Boulevard
West Chester Road

See also
List of rivers of Ohio

References

Ohio Environmental Protection Agency. Mill Creek, 2004

External links
Mill Creek Valley Conservancy District
Mill Creek Alliance
Mill Creek Watershed Council
Deep Stage drainage

Rivers of Ohio
Tributaries of the Ohio River
Rivers of Butler County, Ohio
Landforms of the Cincinnati metropolitan area
Rivers of Hamilton County, Ohio